Wheelers Hill Secondary College is a coeducational state school in the Melbourne suburb of Wheelers Hill, Victoria, Australia. School number 8474.

The College is divided into two sub-schools and six Year levels: Middle School (Years 7 - 9) and Senior School (Years 10 - 12).

History 
Wheelers Hill Secondary College is a government state high school, situated in the City of Monash in Melbourne's eastern suburbs. Established in 1980 as Wheelers Hill High School, the school originally opened with 96 students and nine teachers. The buildings consisted of four general classrooms, three specialist rooms, a library, and an administration office. In 1981, the school's enrolment was boosted by 164 new Year 7 students and an additional 14 Year 8 students. The College current has an enrolment of 700 students from Years 7 to 12.

Facilities 
The school's grounds include:
 A canteen.
 A food technology centre
 A gymnasium
 The Bunjil Performing Arts Centre
 A library
 An art and technology wing
 Science laboratories
 Several computer rooms and smaller computer pods.

Sporting facilities 
The school's grounds include:

 An AFL and cricket oval
 Two football ovals
 Two netball/basketball/tennis courts
 Passive recreation areas in garden settings

Technology facilities 
The school has many computer labs and small pods. These are supported by notebooks which add flexibility to the College's learning programs.

Curriculum
The school has a number of programs that support its core values of excellence, respect, and creativity. Programs such as instrumental music, performing arts, Swimming and Athletics Carnivals, and inter-school sporting programs provide opportunities for students to develop particular skills outside the mainstream classroom.
The College has a strong pastoral care program supported by a Student Welfare Coordinator, Home Groups, and Sub-School teams at each Year level. The College's pastoral programs complement the strong academic and creative traditions of the College. The College places a strong emphasis on development and nurturing of leadership skills is a focus of Wheelers Hill Secondary College, and programs such as Year level camps, the Student Representative Council, and VCAL programs are in place to enable this.

Houses
The four houses are:

  Jells - Blue
  Derrimut - Yellow
  Napier - Red
  Scott - Green

Notable alumni 
 The Living End
 Chris Cheney (vocals, guitar)
 Scott Owen (double bass, vocals)
 Camilla Severi from Big Brother Australia 2006
 Kayne Tremills TV Host
 Kaiit Singer 
 Jordan Dennis Rapper
 Khaled Khalafalla Comedian
 Sophie Koh

See also 
 List of schools in Victoria

References

External links
 Wheelers Hill Secondary College website

Public high schools in Melbourne
Buildings and structures in the City of Monash
Educational institutions established in 1980
1980 establishments in Australia